José Velázquez Jiménez (born 15 November 1951 in Telde, Gran Canaria), better known by his stage name José Vélez, is a Spanish singer.

In the late 1960s, a music teacher from the Organización Juvenil Española (Spanish Youth Organisation) had the idea to create the music group Grupo Marabilla with some of his students, among them José Velázquez. When the group was dissolved, he began his solo career. In 1968 he participated in the talent contest Salto a la fama in Madrid and he began to get some recognition, which led him to establish in Madrid.

In 1976, he brought out his first album, Vino Griego, and in 1977 he participated at the Sopot International Song Festival with the song "Romántica". He was internally chosen by Televisión Española as the Spanish entry for the Eurovision Song Contest 1978 in Paris with the song "Bailemos un vals". He placed 9th in a field of 20.

From that moment onwards he has developed most of his career in Latin America, where he has achieved 19 platinum record and 32 gold records.

References

1951 births
Living people
People from Telde
Singers from the Canary Islands
Spanish male singers
Eurovision Song Contest entrants for Spain
Eurovision Song Contest entrants of 1978